The 1982 French motorcycle Grand Prix was the third round of the 1982 Grand Prix motorcycle racing season. It took place on the weekend of 7–9 May 1982 at the Circuit de Nogaro.

The race was controversial, because the major factory teams (Yamaha, Honda and Suzuki), which included top riders like Kenny Roberts, Barry Sheene, Freddie Spencer, Franco Uncini and Takazumi Katayama, largely or completely boycotted the event due to the dangerous track conditions. Some private drivers also boycotted the race, which led to the venue never reappearing on the calendar ever since.

Gina Bovaird, who took advantage of the major factory team's boycott to qualify for the race, remains the only female rider to ever start a race in the 500cc/MotoGP class.

Classification

500 cc

References

French motorcycle Grand Prix
French
Motorcycle Grand Prix
Motorcycle racing controversies